Ewoud Malan (born 4 July 1953) is a former South African rugby union player.

Playing career

Malan played for Northern Transvaal and the Springboks. He made his international debut in the third test against the visiting Lions team on 28 June 1980, at the Boet Erasmus Stadium, Port Elizabeth, when he replaced the injured Willie Kahts after 33 minutes in the first half. Malan also played in the fourth test against the Lions.

Test history

See also
List of South Africa national rugby union players – Springbok no. 512

References

1953 births
Living people
South African rugby union players
South Africa international rugby union players
People from Groblersdal
Rugby union hookers
Blue Bulls players
Rugby union players from Limpopo